All Dressed Up is a 1918 silent film short produced and directed by Al Christie. It starred Betty Compson.

Cast
Betty Compson
Dorothy Dane
Harry Edwards

See also
Betty Compson filmography

References

External links
 All Dressed Up at IMDb.com

1918 films
Lost American films
American silent short films
American black-and-white films
Films directed by Al Christie
Silent American comedy films
1918 comedy films
1918 lost films
Lost comedy films
1910s American films